Heshmatabad (also Romanized as Ḩeshmatābād and Hashmatābād) is a village in Chalanchulan Rural District, Silakhor District, Dorud County, Lorestan Province, Iran. At the 2006 census, its population was 120, in 26 families.

References 

Towns and villages in Dorud County